Kristoffer Weckström (born 26 May 1983) is a Finnish footballer who has played for IFK Uppsala, a Swedish amateur club. He previously played as a midfielder in Norwegian football club Sarpsborg Sparta FK. He has also played in English football club Derby County during their tenure in the Premier League.

His younger brother is Alexander Weckström.

References

1983 births
Living people
Sportspeople from Åland
Finnish footballers
Finnish expatriate footballers
Derby County F.C. players
Sarpsborg 08 FF players
Association football midfielders